Oddcast is an online marketing company located in New York City and founded in 1999.

Their software PhotoFace allows an uploaded picture to be turned into a 3D face, and then allows the manipulation of the features. They have used this in various marketing campaigns for numerous major corporations.

Background
The company was founded in 1999 by former Israeli army paratrooper and documentary filmmaker Adi Sideman, who as of 2012 is the company's chief executive officer.

Accomplishments

 For McDonald's in Europe, they created a promotion called “Avatarize yourself”, which encouraged people to go to a website and use a photograph of themselves to change into a Na'vi from the film Avatar.
 They have worked with CareerBuilder to create Monk-e-Mail, which allows people to send messages with images of talking chimpanzees they can customize. Over 160 million messages have been sent thus far.
 Ford's Theme Song-a-tron
 Tide's Talking Stain
 Volkswagen's Babymaker
 7-Eleven's BrainFreeze Laboratory, used to promote its Slurpee beverage.
 OfficeMax's Elfyourself.
 Monk-e-Mail

References

External links
 Official website
 monk-e-mail

Marketing companies of the United States